The Battle of Vaspurakan was a battle between Seljuk and Byzantine forces in 1046 during which the Turks raided Vaspurakan and then defeated and captured its governor.

The Seljuk ruler Tughril Bey sent Ibrahim Yinal and Qutalmish to Azerbaijan, they advanced towards the lands inhabited by the Armenians and Georgians. The son of Chaghri Bey, Yakuti, conquered al-Jebel, Daylem and parts of Azerbaijan. The Seljuk advance had therefore reached the Aras river. In 1046 the Seljuk Turks defeated the Byzantines in the Battle of Ganja. Following this battle the Seljuk Turks entered into another conflict with the Byzantines.

In 1046 Qutalmish initiated a conflict with the Byzantines, this was because the Seljuks were denied permission to cross Lake Van by the regent of Vaspurakan, Stephanos. As a result, a battle ensued and Qutalmish emerged victorious over the Byzantine regent. Stephanos was taken captive by the Seljuks and sold in a slave market in Tabriz.

References

Battles involving the Seljuk Empire
Battles involving the Byzantine Empire